The late Ming peasant rebellions were a series of peasant revolts during the last decades of the Ming dynasty lasting from 1628–1644. They were caused by natural disasters in Shaanxi, Shanxi, and Henan. At the same time, the She-An Rebellion and Later Jin invasions forced the Ming government to cut funding for the postal service, which resulted in the mass unemployment of men in the provinces hit hard by natural disasters. Unable to cope with three major crises at the same time, the Ming dynasty collapsed in 1644.

Origin
In 1618, the Later Jin dynasty under Nurhaci started attacking the Ming dynasty in the Manchuria. By 1627, the war with the Later Jin as well as the eruption of the She-An Rebellion in 1621 had drained Ming treasuries to dangerously low levels, with just seven million taels left in the Taicang Vault. The Ming realm was also suffering from natural disasters in Shaanxi, Shanxi and Henan. In 1627 widespread drought in Shaanxi resulted in mass starvation as harvests failed and people turned to cannibalism. Natural disasters in Shaanxi were not unusual but in the last 60 years of the Ming, they were especially bad, and there was not a single year in which Shaanxi did not experience a natural disaster. The entire region was a natural disaster zone. Shanxi too suffered from windstorms, earthquakes, and famines. In the south, Henan also experienced starvation and it was said that "grains of rice became as precious as pearls." The Chongzhen Emperor's petty and mercurial ways exacerbated the situation by constantly switching grand secretaries, which prevented a coherent government response from coalescing. Chongzhen's reign alone saw around 50 grand secretaries appointed to the post, representing two-thirds of all holders of that post throughout the entire Ming dynasty.

To prevent further depletion of the imperial treasury, Chongzhen cut funding for the Ming postal service, which saw the mass unemployment of large numbers of men from the central and northern provinces around the Yellow River region. This in turn contributed to the overall deterioration of government control and the formation of bandit groups which became endemic in the last decades of the Ming.

Rebellion

In the spring of 1628, Wang Jiayin started a revolt in Shaanxi with some 6,000 followers, one of whom was Zhang Xianzhong, who would go on to depopulate Sichuan in the future. The rebellion posed no threat to the Ming army, but due to the rugged mountain terrain of Shaanxi, the Ming pacification army of 17,000 was unable to effectively root out the rebels.

Another bandit leader Gao Yingxiang rose up in revolt and joined Wang Jiayin soon after. In early 1629 the veteran anti-rebel leader Yang He was called into service and made Supreme Commander of the Three Border Regions. What he found was that situations were even more dire than they appeared. Salaries for soldiers of Shaanxi were three years in arrears, and their own soldiers were deserting to join the rebels. Yang was unable to suppress Wang Jiayin's rebels, who took several isolated fortresses as late as 1630. Yang's policy of amnesty for surrendered peasants was generally ineffective. Once surrendered, the peasants would go back to their homes and join other rebel bands. Despite Ming victories in battle, peasant rebellions would remain a major problem for the remainder of the Ming dynasty. Yang He was eventually impeached and arrested for ineffectiveness. He was replaced with Hong Chengchou who would later defect to the Qing dynasty. His subordinates, in particular the brothers Cao Wenzhao and Cao Bianjiao were reckless. Soldiers slaughtered rebels as well as civilians alike to turn in heads for rewards. At one point an official even submitted female heads, claiming they were bandits. He was demoted. It was estimated that by 1631 there were roughly 200,000 rebels operating in 36 rebel groups.

Zhang Xianzhong
Zhang Xianzhong was a native of Yan'an, Shaanxi. He was said to be strong, valiant, but also hairy and had a lust for killing. In his official biography, it is said that "if a single day went by and he did not kill someone, then he was really unhappy." When his family disowned him for getting into repeated fights with his peers, he joined the army, which sentenced him to death for breaking military law. An officer named Chen Hongfan spared him due to being impressed by his valiance. Zhang Xianzhong then joined the rebellion and followed Ma Shouying, who made him a petty officer and named him the "Yellow Tiger". Eventually hardship struck in the winter of 1631 and Zhang was forced to surrender with Luo Rucai, the first of several times he would do so out of expedience.

Li Zicheng
Li Zicheng was the second son of Li Shouzhong and hailed from Mizhi, Shaanxi. Li showed an aptitude for horse archery at an early age but was forced to become a shepherd  at the age of ten due to poverty. He became an orphan when his mother died three years later. Li joined the army at the age of 16 but later left and entered the postal service in 1626. At some point Li became an outlaw for killing a man he found in bed with his wife after returning from an extended business trip. He was arrested and jailed until his nephew Li Guo freed him, and together they fled the area. In Gansu, Li Zicheng joined the army again and became a squad commander of 50 men. After taking part in the suppression of the rebel Gao Yingxiang, Li himself became a rebel due to charges of stealing rations.

Rebel movements
By 1633, the rebels had spread into Huguang, Sichuan, Shanxi. Chen Qiyu was made Supreme Commander of Shaanxi, Shanxi, Henan, Huguang, and Sichuan. He drove out Zhang Xianzhong and Luo Rucai from Sichuan. The rebels in Henan were driven west until they were bottled up in the southwestern corner of Henan in Chexiang Gorge. Heavy rains battered the rebels for 40 days. After weeks of deprivation, 13,000 rebels, including Li Zicheng, surrendered to Chen Qiyu. They were returned to their homes under supervision, but when 36 rebels were killed and their heads hung up on the city walls, a full-scale revolt broke out again.

Li Zicheng besieged Longzhou but was driven away by Zuo Guangxian. Despite the inability of the rebels to take well-defended cities, the Ming army was also unable to decisively defeat them, so the Ming started building blockhouses in towns to fortify the countryside. In 1635, a meeting between major rebel groups took place at Rongyang in Central Henan. Zhang Xianzhong and Gao Yingxiang were tasked with taking Southern Zhili, Luo Rucai with defending the Yellow River, and Ma Shouying with leading the mobile division. Zhang and Gao sacked Fengyang, the ancestral home of the Hongwu Emperor and the location of his tomb. Over 4,000 Ming officials were killed and 2,600 structures were burned down. During the operation, a dispute occurred between Li Zicheng and Zhang Xianzhong on whether or not to kill the eunuchs, which led to the dissolution of the rebel alliance. They split up with Li moving west and Zhang to the east.

Zhang Xianzhong failed to take the city of Luzhou, which was heavily defended with cannons that dealt heavy casualties to the rebels, killing 1,100. Li Zicheng continued his rebel activity throughout 1635 and 1636 with modest success; however, his lieutenant defected to the Ming and took Li's girlfriend along with him. Li lost Xianyang to the Ming after that. To the north, a 43,000 strong Ming army arrived in Henan under the command of Hong Chengchou but he failed to rout the rebels and even suffered a defeat. Lu Xiangsheng was put in charge of rebel pacification in Huguang. Meanwhile the Ming suffered a major defeat when rebel forces surrounded Cao Wenzhao when he overextended and ran into rebel cavalry forces. Cao killed himself.

The rebels had become better organized and even had heavy cannons by 1636. Gao Yingxiang moved towards Taozhou and crushed a Ming army on his way to Nanjing. Gao was then defeated in a series of battles against Lu Xiangsheng but escaped. Lu was unable to follow up on his victories and he was called back to the northern frontier to deal with the Qing dynasty's invasion. Sun Chuanting was made Grand Coordinator of Shaanxi. Sun captured Gao Yingxiang when he invaded Shaanxi and sent him to Beijing where he was dismembered. His followers joined other rebel leaders such as Li Zicheng and Lao Huihui.

The rebel situation deteriorated even further as the Chongzhen Emperor raised taxes in 1637 to fund the military. A new Vice Minister of War, Xiong Wencan, was put in charge of overall rebel pacification activities, but Hong Chengchou and Zuo Liangyu basically ignored all his orders. Hong was able to defeat Li Zicheng in Sichuan, but victory in battle meant little against the rebel forces, and sometimes the army would even loot and rape in the area evicted of rebels. Ming forces continued to score victories against Li Zicheng and Zhang Xianzhong without being able to kill or capture them. At one point Zhang Xianzhong even surrendered and was awarded troops and supplies on the promise that he would fight against Li Zicheng.

Throughout 1638 and 1639, earthquakes rattled Sichuan and locusts ravaged Suzhou. The rebel movement gained momentum as even more refugees joined them to increase their odds of survival. Li Zicheng kept losing battles and fled into the mountains. Luo Rucai surrendered to the Ming. It appeared for a time that ultimate victory was within grasp for the Ming forces. The Qing invaded again in 1638, exacerbating the Ming's already depleted resources. In 1639, Zhang Xianzhong rebelled again after having recuperated in Gucheng. He opened the prisons of Gucheng and killed the local officials. Joining forces, Zhang and Luo attacked the nearby town of Fangxian and then moved towards the heavily forested mountains of the Shaanxi border. Zuo Liangyu was sent against the renewed rebellion. He was ambushed near Mount Luoying and suffered 10,000 losses. Xiong Wencan was impeached and replaced by Yang Sichang.

Although Yang Sichang and Zuo Liangyu clashed on policy, they scored a number of victories against the rebels from 1639 to 1640. It appeared once again that the Ming were finally turning the tide. Zuo inflicted a major defeat on Zhang Xianzhong near Mount Manao, killing 3,500 and capturing several commanders. Zhang escaped to western Sichuan. Yang became wary of Zuo's successes and tried to promote another general, He Renlong, as his equal. When that didn't work, both generals were alienated. By the winter of 1640, Sichuan was being ravaged by Zhang Xianzhong, and Ming forces were deserting on a daily basis. Yang requested to be relieved from his post. The Chongzhen Emperor refused and instead sent him more funds for medicine and famine relief.

Rise of Li Zicheng (1641–1644)

In 1641, Zhang Xianzhong captured Xiangyang and Li Zicheng captured Luoyang. Li soon lost Luoyang to Ming forces but he was recognized by then as the foremost rebel leader. With his large following he besieged Kaifeng. Upon hearing this, Yang Sichang stopped eating and died in spring. He was replaced by Ding Qirui. Meanwhile Zhang Xianzhong was beaten back and forced to move west from Yunyang. Even as the Ming armies collapsed from 1641 to 1644, they were still scoring local victories over the rebels.

Ding Qirui was unable to control his starving men who looted the towns they crossed. Some simply deserted to scrounge for food. Ding was impeached and replaced by Fu Zonglong. Zhang Xianzhong's army had swelled upward of 100,000 but he was unable to score any major victories against Ming forces except in the taking of cities in Sichuan, which they slaughtered. Luo Rucai left Zhang and joined Li Zicheng. Li captured both Xincai and Nanyang, and in the process killed Fu Zonglong and Meng Ruhu. He Renlong was executed for being suspected of aiding the rebels.

In 1642, Xiangcheng, Shucheng, Runing, Xiangyang, De'an, and Chengtian all fell to Li Zicheng. Zhang Xianzhong took Luzhou. Li's siege of Kaifeng went badly as he tried again and again to take the heavily defended city. During one attack, he lost an eye to an arrow. The city was finally taken on 7 October 1642 by diverting a river and flooding the city, killing 270,000 people. The rebels looted whatever was left of the city and retreated. 

By 1643, the rebels had coalesced into just two major factions in Li Zicheng in Central China and Zhang Xianzhong in Sichuan. Li declared himself Prince of Shun and Zhang declared himself Prince of the West. Wuchang, Hanyang, and Changsha fell to Zhang. Li felt threatened by Zhang's growing success so he put a bounty on his head. Li also consolidated power within his own faction by eliminating Luo Rucai and other local bandits. In the autumn, the Chongzhen Emperor ordered Sun Chuanting to attack Li. This turned out to be the last Ming offensive as the Ming army was completely destroyed and Sun killed in battle. Li followed up the victory by capturing Xi'an, which surrendered without a fight.

In 1644, Li Zicheng declared the formation of the Shun dynasty. In Beijing, Chongzhen made a last-ditch effort to raise an army from the civilian population and sent them out against Li. More than half the army deserted before they were even 100 li away from Beijing. Li advanced on the Ming capital in two directions, taking Taiyuan, Datong, and Changping in the process. On 24 April, one of Chongzhen's eunuchs ordered the gates to be opened for the rebels, but the guards refused. The defense shot off their cannons in a large show of force, but they had no ammunition. When the rebels realized that only powder was being fired, they attacked in force and took the city gates in a brief struggle. The Chongzhen Emperor ordered the imperial family to commit suicide. Before hanging himself, Chongzhen cut off the arm of one of the princesses who could not bring themselves to suicide. She was still alive the next day when the rebels found her. Li Zicheng's victory was short-lived. The next month the northern general Wu Sangui defected to the Qing dynasty, and together they defeated Li at the Battle of Shanhai Pass. Li's Shun dynasty was dismantled the following year, with Li himself disappearing in the chaos. Zhang Xianzhong was killed by Qing forces in 1647.

Citations

Bibliography

Ming dynasty
Rebellions in the Ming dynasty
17th century in China
Transition from Ming to Qing